Paul Fischl was an Austrian footballer who played as a defender. He played for DFC Prag in the inaugural German football championship in 1903, and also represented the Austria national football team on three occasions.

References

External links
  
 
 

Austrian footballers
Austria international footballers
Association football defenders
1880 births
1960 deaths
Footballers from Prague
DFC Prag players